Bill Walker may refer to:

Australian rules football
 Bill A. Walker (1886–1934), Australian rules footballer for Essendon
 Bill Walker (Australian footballer, born 1883) (1883–1971), Australian rules footballer for Fitzroy
 Bill J. V. Walker (1886–1949), Australian rules footballer for University
 Bill Walker (Australian footballer, born 1942), Australian rules footballer for Swan Districts

US sport
 Bill Walker (American football) (1933–2019), American football player
 Bill Walker (baseball) (1903–1966), American baseball pitcher
 Bill Walker (Toledo basketball) (born c. 1926), American basketball player
 Henry Walker (basketball) (born 1987), American basketball player previously known as Bill Walker

Politics
 Bill Walker (American politician) (born 1951), American lawyer and politician, former Governor of Alaska
 Bill Walker (Canadian politician) (born 1966), Member of the Legislative Assembly of Ontario
 Bill Walker (Scottish Conservative politician) (1929–2017), Scottish politician, Conservative Party MP, 1979–1997
 Bill Walker (SNP politician) (born 1942), Scottish politician, MSP for Dunfermline, 2011–2013

Other
 Bill Walker (music director) (1927–2022), Australian music composer and director
 Bill Walker (actor) (1896–1992), American television and film actor
 Bill Walker (other actor), American film actor, co-star of 1961 film The Mask
 Bill Walker (artist) (1917–2011), Chicago muralist
 Bill Walker (broadcaster) (1922–1995), Canadian broadcaster and actor

See also
 William Walker (disambiguation)
 Billy Walker (disambiguation)